The Cairns Cup is an annual round robin chess tournament for the leading women's chess players held in St. Louis, Missouri in the United States. The inaugural edition in 2019 was won by Valentina Gunina. The second edition in 2020 was won by Koneru Humpy.

References

Chess competitions
Women's chess competitions
Chess in the United States
2019 in chess
2019 establishments in Missouri
Recurring sporting events established in 2019